Kalpa is a small village in the Sutlej river valley, above Reckong Peo in the Kinnaur district of Himachal Pradesh, Northern India, in the Indian Himalaya. The region is inhabited by the Kinnauri people and is known for its apple orchards, as apples are a major cash-crop for the region. The local Kinnauri follow a syncretism of Hinduism and Buddhism, and many temples in Kalpa are dedicated to both Hindu and Buddhist gods and goddesses. The average literacy rate of Kalpa is around 83.75%. India's first ever voter, Shyam Saran Negi, also belongs to Kalpa.

Geography

It has an average elevation of 2,960 metres (9,711 feet) and is located 265 kilometres (165 mi) beyond Shimla on the NH-5 in Kinnaur district. It sits at the base of the snow-capped Kinnaur Kailash ranges. The Shivling peaks rise up to 6,000 m (20,000 feet). Kalpa is nestled among apple orchards, pine-nut forests, and the stately deodhars.

Overview

Kalpa is a village with a history of ancient temples. The Sutlej River below runs through deep gorges, and the winding mountain road is bordered by chilgoza forests. The serenity of this sleepy hamlet was not often visited by foreigners until recently, but there are still relatively few visitors. There are now more than five places to stay in Kalpa and more below in Reckong Peo where travelers must stop to get their inner line permits to continue upwards to the Spiti Valley, which is a small ancient part of what used to be Tibet. Also visible from here is the sacred Shivling rock on the Kailash mountain that changes its color at different points in the day.

In Episode 5 of Ice Road Truckers#IRT: Deadliest Roads - Season 1: Himalayas Lisa Kelly and Rick Yemm delivered two images (one each) (well packed with sandbags and sand and straw) of the goddess Kali (shown as treading on her husband Shiva) along a frightful mountain road hacked out of cliffsides to a temple at Kalpa.

Demography

Kalpa has an average literacy rate of 83.75%.

Religion

Hinduism is the main religion in the district followed by Tibetan Buddhism. These two religions have undergone religious mixing, along with some indigenous shamanistic practices.

Places of interest
Reckong Peo : Located 260 km from Shimla, 7 km from Powari and 8 km from Kalpa. Reckong Peo is the headquarters of district Kinnaur.

Kothi Temple: Just 3 km from Reckong Peo. Kothi has a temple dedicated to the goddess Chandika Devi. Set against a backdrop of mountains and groves of the deodar the temple has an unusual architectural style and fine sculpture. An exquisite gold image of goddess is enshrined in sanctum.

The Chaka Meadows is an easy hike of 3-4 kilometres. The trail starts from a point on Kalpa - Roghi road. Chaka meadows ( alt. 3800 m) offers splendid views of the Kinnaur Kailash mountain range.

Agriculture
The region is very famous for production of high-quality apples and pinus gerardiana, also known as chilghoza. All of tehsil Kalpa is apple growing area, the primary crop for residents of the area. Kalpa is surrounded by Deodar, apple, and pinus gerardiana chilghoza trees.

Climate

All of Kalpa enjoys a temperate climate due to its high elevation, with long winters from October to May, and short summers from June to September. In winter, all the villages are covered by about 5–7 feet of snow, and the temperature can drop to as low as -20 °C. Warm clothing may be necessary even in the summer.

Food habits
The staple foods are wheat, ogla, phafra, and barley, all local produce. Besides these, kankani, cheena, maize, chollair and bathu are also common. The principal pulses consumed are peas, black peas, mash and rajmash. The vegetables usually consumed are cabbage, turnips, peas, beans, pumpkin, potato, okra and tomato besides some locally available wild greens. Also popular is rice, which is imported from the plains. A salted tea in the morning and evening is very popular among the Kinnauris, usually taken along with sattu made of parched barley flour. People are non-vegetarian and eat goat and ram's meat. Alcoholic drinks in day-to-day life and also on ceremonial or festive occasions are quite common. Alcohol is distilled at the household level. It is made out of locally grown fruits like grapes, apple, and pears, as well as from barley.

Lifestyle
Generally, Kinner houses have storerooms for keeping grain and dried fruits, and separate wooden grain-storage structures, called kathar. Pakpa, a piece of sheepskin or yakskin, is often placed on the khayarcha mat.
Traditionally Kinners use utensils made of brass and bronze. Modern influences have included the introduction of Chinese crockery, and utensils made of stainless steel and aluminium.
Clothes are mainly of wool. The thepang, a grey woollen cap with green velvet band is worn by the local people . The Tibetan chhuba, a long woollen coat which resembles an achkan, is worn as well, with a sleeveless woollen jacket. While men wear woollen churidhar pajamas, and tailored woollen shirts such as the chamn kurti, the women wrap themselves up in a dohru. The first wrap of the dohru is based on the back, with embroidered borders displayed throughout its length, which stretches to the heels. Darker shades of colours are preferred for the Dohru, although other coloured shawls may be worn, usually draped over the shoulders. A choli, another type of full sleeved blouse worn by women, may serve as a decorative lining as well.
The Kinners are classified mainly into two castes: lower and upper caste. Again both of these categories are divided into sub classes. The caste system is more prevalent in the Lower and Middle Kinnaur regions

Gallery

References

External links
 Kalpa - Kinnaur - Indian Himalayas
 Photographs of Kalpa

Cities and towns in Kinnaur district
Tourism in Himachal Pradesh